

Amphibian
Phylum: Chordata
Class: Amphibia

Amphibians are tetrapod animals from the class Amphibia comprising toads, frogs, salamanders, newts and caecilians. They have an amphibious lifestyle, where the larvae are aquatic. Skin is generally soft and with glands. They show three type of respiration through moist skin, buccal cavity and lungs. Caecilians are limbless amphibians, whereas other amphibians have short limbs. Amphibians lay cluster of eggs as egg masses closer to a water body and show an external fertilization.

About 20 species of amphibians are found in Czech Republic. The low numbers is due to cold climate, where both amphibians and reptiles are poikilothermic animals they cannot survive in very cold environments. This is a list of amphibians and reptiles found in Czech Republic.

Order: Caudata - Salamanders and allies

Family: Salamandridae - True salamanders & Newts

Order: Anura - Frogs and toads

Family: Bombinatoridae - Fire-bellied toads

Family: Bufonidae - Tree toads

Family: Hylidae - Tree frogs

Family: Pelobatidae - Spadefoot toads

Family: Ranidae - True frogs

Reptile
Phylum: Chordata
Class: Reptilia

Reptiles are tetrapod animals from the class Reptilia comprising today's turtles, crocodilians, snakes, amphisbaenians, lizards, tuatara, and their extinct relatives. Reptiles are vertebrates, creatures that either have four limbs or, like snakes, are descended from four-limbed ancestors. Unlike amphibians, reptiles do not have an aquatic larval stage. Most reptiles are oviparous, although several species of squamates are viviparous, as were some extinct aquatic clades — the fetus develops within the mother, contained in a placenta rather than an eggshell. As amniotes, reptile eggs are surrounded by membranes for protection and transport, which adapt them to reproduction on dry land.

There are about 16 species of reptiles found in Czech republic. The only venomous snake is the European adder.

Order: Testudines - Turtles

Family: Emydidae - Terrapins

Order: Squamata - Scaled reptiles

Family: Anguidae

Family: Lacertidae - True lizards

Suborder: Serpentes - Snakes

Family: Colubridae - Colubrids

Family: Viperidae - Vipers

References

External links

Herpetofauna
Herpetofauna